Sabado Badoo is a 2015 Philippine television comedy anthology broadcast by GMA Network. Hosted by Betong Sumaya and Sef Cadayona, it premiered on March 14, 2015. The show concluded on July 25, 2015 with a total of 20 episodes.

Segments
 ArtistaGram
 Hugot Lines

Ratings
According to AGB Nielsen Philippines' Mega Manila household television ratings, the pilot episode of Sabado Badoo earned a 13.1% rating. While the final episode scored a 17.4% rating.

References

2015 Philippine television series debuts
2015 Philippine television series endings
Filipino-language television shows
GMA Network original programming
Philippine anthology television series
Philippine comedy television series